Kelvinbridge subway station is a Glasgow Subway station serving the Woodlands, Woodside and Hillhead areas of Glasgow, Scotland. It is named after the bridge crossing the River Kelvin, next to the station. This station is one of the two serving Kelvingrove Park, the other being Kelvinhall.

The station – along with the rest of the Subway system – was opened in 1896 and closed for refurbishment in 1977, reopening in 1980. It retains the original island platform layout, and is by far the busiest station to retain this configuration.

The station has a car park, built on the site of the goods yard at Kelvinbridge on the Stobcross to Maryhill Central line.

The station is the deepest station in the network due to its close proximity to the River Kelvin, and was originally entered through a tenement block on South Woodside Road with access to Great Western Road via an external cast iron staircase descending from the eponymous bridge. Following modernisation, a purpose-built surface-level ticket hall has offered direct access to the new main entrance on Great Western Road via a glass-enclosed escalator.

The former station entrance is now the emergency exit from today's station, the emergency exit being marked by red doors at the bottom of the iron staircase, and "keep clear" signs.

Past passenger numbers 
 2011/12: 0.913 million annually

References

Glasgow Subway stations
Railway stations in Great Britain opened in 1896
1896 establishments in Scotland
Railway stations located underground in the United Kingdom
Hillhead